The 2017 Empire Slovak Open was a professional tennis tournament played on outdoor clay courts. It was the ninth edition of the tournament and part of the 2017 ITF Women's Circuit, offering a total of $100,000 in prize money. It took place in Trnava, Slovakia, from 15–21 May 2017.

Point distribution

Singles main draw entrants

Seeds 

 1 Rankings as of 8 May 2017

Other entrants 
The following players received wildcards into the singles main draw:
  Vivien Juhászová
  Viktória Kužmová
  Tereza Mihalíková
  Anna Karolína Schmiedlová

The following players received entry into the singles main draw by a protected ranking:
  Alexa Glatch

The following players received entry into the singles main draw by a junior exempt:
  Anastasia Potapova

The following players received entry from the qualifying draw:
  Viktoria Kamenskaya
  Monika Kilnarová
  Antonia Lottner
  Nicole Melichar

Champions

Singles

 Markéta Vondroušová def.  Verónica Cepede Royg, 7–5, 7–6(7–3)

Doubles

 Naomi Broady /  Heather Watson def.  Chuang Chia-jung /  Renata Voráčová, 6–3, 6–2

External links 
 2017 Empire Slovak Open at ITFtennis.com
 Official website

2017 in Slovak tennis
2017 ITF Women's Circuit
2017
2017